The Bharatmala Pariyojna ( 'India garland project') is an ecosystem of road development which includes development of tunnels, bridges, elevated corridors, flyovers, overpass, interchanges, bypasses, ring roads etc. to provide shortest, jam free & optimized connectivity to multiple places, it is a centrally-sponsored and funded Road and Highways project of the Government of India. Bharatmala is mainly focused on connecting remote areas and satellite cities of megacities such as Bengaluru, Pune, Hyderabad etc. The project will build highways from Maharashtra, Gujarat, Rajasthan, Punjab, Haryana and then cover the entire string of Himalayan territories - Jammu and Kashmir, Himachal Pradesh, Uttarakhand - and then portions of borders of Uttar Pradesh and Bihar alongside Terai, and move to West Bengal, Sikkim, Assam, Arunachal Pradesh, and right up to the Indo-Myanmar border in Manipur and Mizoram. Special emphasis will be given on providing connectivity to far-flung border and rural areas including the tribal and backward areas. Bharatmala Project will interconnect 550 District Headquarters (from current 300) through a minimum 4-lane highway by raising the number of corridors to 50 (from current 6) and move 80% freight traffic (40% currently) to National Highways by interconnecting 24 logistics parks, 66 inter-corridors (IC) of total , 116 feeder routes (FR) of total  and 7 north east Multi-Modal waterway ports.

The ambitious umbrella programme will subsume all existing Highway Projects including the flagship National Highways Development Project (NHDP), launched by the Atal Bihari Vajpayee government in 1998.

Other than NHDP related projects which are greenfield, there is Brownfield National Highway Projects which is a upgradation/widening of existing 4 lane highways into 6 lane highways which are not controlled access highways. Many state highways have been converted to National Highways under this project. 

It is both enabler and beneficiary of other key Government of India schemes, such as Sagarmala, Dedicated Freight Corridors, Industrial corridors, UDAN-RCS, BharatNet, Digital India, Parvatmala and Make in India.

Scope

Context 
India's 6,215,797 km (3,862,317 mi) road network is second largest in the world, of which only 2% (~1,10,000 km) are national highways (NHs) carrying 40% road traffic. Bharatmala phase-I will raise the NH connection to a total of 80% or 550 districts out of total 718 districts from the current 42% or 300 districts connected to NH (dec 2017). Mapping of Shortest Route for 12,000 routes carrying 90% of the India's freight, commodity-wise survey of freight movement across 600 districts, automated traffic surveys over 1,500+ points 
across the country, and satellite mapping of corridors was done to identify upgradation requirements for Bharatmala.

NHIDCL 
National Highways and Infrastructure Development Corporation Limited was created in 2014 as a fully owned company of the Ministry of Road Transport and Highways by the Government of India to expedite construction of National Highway projects with specific focus on Northeast India.

Central Road Fund (CRF) 
Central Road Fund (CRF) was created as a non-lapsable fund under the "Central Road Fund Act 2000", by imposing a cess on petrol and diesel, to build and upgrade National Highways, State roads, rural roads, railway under/over bridges etc., and national waterways.

Impact
Bharatmala will significantly boost highway infrastructure:
 Raise 6 NC corridors to 50 corridors (6 NC and 44 EC)
 Raise 40% freight to 80% freight on National Highways
 Raise 300 districts to 550 districts connected by minimum 4-lane highways.

Components

National Highways Development Project (NHDP)
The uncompleted projects under NHDP will also be subsumed in Bharatmala. NHDP was meant to convert dirt roads into National Highways or any 1/2 lane roads into 4 lane national highways.

National Corridors (NC) 
National Corridors of India (NC) are 6 high volume corridors, including 4 in Golden Quadrilateral and 2 in North–South and East–West Corridors, including Mumbai - Kolkata Highway (NH6), known as East Coast - West Coast Corridor,  that carry 35% of India's freight. Lane expansion to 6 to 8 laning, ring roads, bypasses and elevated corridors will be built in Bharatmala to decongest the National Corridors. Logistics Parks will be set up along the NC. Busiest stretches of National Corridors will be converted to the expressways.  inter-corridor and  feeder routes will be built. Additionally,  of border roads and  international highways will be built to connect 6 National Corridors to international trade routes.

National Corridors Efficiency Program (NCEP)
National Corridors Efficiency Program (NCEP) entails  phase-I decongestion of 185 choke points by 34 6-8 laning, 45 bypasses and 30 ring roads of 6 NC.

New ring roads in Bharatmala include:

 Agra
 Amaravati
 Belgaum
 Bengaluru
 Bhubaneswar
 Chitradurga
 Delhi
 Dhanbad
 Dhule
 Gurugram
 Indore
 Jabalpur
 Jaipur
 Kota
 Lucknow
 Madurai
 Nagpur
 Patna
 Pune
 Raipur
 Ranchi
 Sagar
 Sambalpur
 Shivpuri
 Solapur
 Surat
 Thiruvananthapuram
 Udaipur
 Varanasi
 Vijayawada

Economic Corridors
Economic Corridors of India  or Industrial Corridors of India, 44 corridors  were identified and  will be taken up in phase-I, they exclude 6 National Corridors, they include:  66  inter-corridors (IC) & 116  feeder routes (FR) were identified for Bharatmala.

List of 44 economic corridors (EC):

 EC-1: Mumbai-Kolkata 
 EC-2: Mumbai-Kanyakumari
 EC-3: Amritsar-Jamnagar
 EC-4: Kandla-Sagar
 EC-5: Agra-Mumbai 
 EC-6: Pune-Vijayawada 
 EC-7: Raipur-Dhanbad
 EC-8: Ludhiana-Ajmer
 EC-9: Surat-Nagpur
 EC-10: Hyderabad-Panaji 
 EC-11: Jaipur-Indore 
 EC-12: Solapur-Nagpur 
 EC-13: Sagar-Varanasi 
 EC-14: Kharagpur-Siliguri 
 EC-15: Raipur-Visakhapatnam 
 EC-16: Delhi-Lucknow 
 EC-17: Chennai-Kurnool 
 EC-18: Indore-Nagpur 
 EC-19: Chennai-Madurai 
 EC-20: Mangaluru-Raichur
 EC-21: Tuticorin-Cochin
 EC-22: Solapur-Bellary-Gooty
 EC-23: Hyderabad-Aurangabad 
 EC-24: Delhi-Kanpur
 EC-25: Tharad-Phalodi 
 EC-26: Nagaur-Mandi Dabwali 
 EC-27: Sagar-Lucknow 
 EC-28: Sambalpur-Paradeep 
 EC-29: Amreli-Vadodra 
 EC-30: Godhra-Khargone 
 EC-31: Sambalpur-Ranchi 
 EC-32: Bengaluru-Malappuram
 EC-33: Raisen-Pathariya
 EC-34: Bengaluru-Mangaluru 
 EC-35: Chittaurgarh-Indore 
 EC-36: Bilaspur-New Delhi
 EC-37: Solapur-Mahabubnagar 
 EC-38: Bengaluru-Nellore
 EC-39: Ajmer-Udaipur 
 EC-40: Sirsa-Delhi 
 EC-41: Sirohi-Beawar 
 EC-42: Jaipur-Agra 
 EC-43: Pune-Aurangabad 
 EC-44: North East Corridor

Logistics parks
Logistics parks entailing 45% of India's freight traffic have been identified to be connected by Bharatmala economic corridors (EC), to develop hub-and-spoke model where hub-to-hub transport can be done with 30 tonne trucks and hub-to-spoke transport can be done with 10 tonne trucks. Currently all transport is point-to-point in 10 tonne trucks (2017).

 Ambala
 Bengaluru
 Bathinda
 Bhopal
 Chennai
 Cochin
 Coimbatore
 Guwahati
 Hisar
 Hyderabad
 Indore
 Jagatsinghpur
 Jaipur
 Jammu
 Kandla
 Kolkata
 Kota
 Nagpur
 Nashik
 Panaji
 Patna
 Pune
 Raipur
 Rajkot
 Solan
 Sundargarh
 Valsad
 Vijayawada
 Visakhapatnam
 North Gujarat
 Ahmedabad 
 Vadodara
 South Gujarat
 Surat
 Bharuch
 North Punjab
 Jalandhar 
 Amritsar 
 Gurdaspur
 South Punjab
 Ludhiana
 Sangrur
 Patiala
 Delhi-NCR
 Delhi 
 Faridabad (IMT Manesar)
 Narnaul (Nangal Choudhary IMHL)
 Ghaziabad
 MMR
 Mumbai
 Mumbai suburbs
 Jnpt 
 Mumbai Port
 Thane
 Raigad

Northeast India connectivity
North East Economic corridor will connect 7 state capitals and 7 multimodal waterways terminals on Brahmaputra
on the bharatmala route (slide 21). 

 Dhubri
 Silghat
 Biswanath Ghat
 Neamati
 Dibrugarh 
 Sengajan
 Oriyamghat

International connectivity

Look-East Connectivity will be further developed in the Bharatmala routes (slide 22). 
 24 Integrated check posts (ICPs)
 Transit through Bangladesh to improve Northeast India
 Integrating Bangladesh–Bhutan–Nepal-Myanmar–Thailand BIMSTEC corridors.

Finance
Total budget  for 5 years Bharatmala project from 2017 to 2022. 
  existing NH projects subsumed under Bharatmala, such as incomplete National Highways, SARDP-NE, Externally Aided Projects (EAP, e.g. world Bank and ADB), and Left Wing Extremism roads (LWE).
  phase-I to be completed during 2017-dec 2019: 
  through market borrowings.
  through private investments. 
  through the Central Road Fund (CRF) and tolls:
  from CRF. 
  from new toll monetisation of completed highways.
  from current toll fee from Toll-Permanent Bridge Fee Fund (PBFF)).
 Fy2017-18:
  highways built at the rate of 27 km/day, 
  through allocation in the national budget.
 Fy2018-19:
  will be awarded.
  will be completed. 
  total spend:
  through allocation in the national budget,
  through bonds, 
  through toll monetisation of 30 completed highways.

Implementation phases: 2017-2022
The plan envisages the construction of  roads, including  of additional highways and roads across the country, apart from an existing plan of building  of new highways by the National Highway Authority of India. Bharatmala has synergy with Sagarmala.

Phase 1: 34,800 km by December 2022
The total length of  highways will be constructed under phase-I by December 2022, including  of new highways and another  currently under-construction remaining incomplete under NHDP, compared to 19 years it took to upgrade almost same length of National Highways under NHDP.

Phase-II: 48,877 km (expected 2024)
Multimodal logistics parks. It will make current corridors more effective  & will improve connectivity with north east and leverage synergy with inland waterways.

Multi-modal logistics parks will provide seamless cargo transfer between Railways cargo, Inland Waterways, Air cargo, Dedicated Freight Corridors, Access-Controlled Expressways, National Highways, State Highways in a Hub and Spoke model.

See also

 Similar rail development
 Future of rail transport in India, rail development

 Similar roads development
 Bharatmala components or predecessors
 Diamond Quadrilateral, Subsumed in Bharatmala
 Golden Quadrilateral, completed national road development connectivity older scheme
 National Highways Development Project, Subsumed in Bharatmala
 North-South and East-West Corridor, Subsumed in Bharatmala
 India-China Border Roads, Subsumed in Bharatmala
 Expressways of India
 Setu Bharatam, river road bridge development in India

 Similar ports and river transport development
 Char Dham Highway
 Indian Rivers Inter-link
 List of National Waterways in India
 Sagar Mala project, national water port development connectivity scheme

 Similar air transport development
 Indian Human Spaceflight Programme
 UDAN, national airport development connectivity scheme

 Highways in India
 List of National Highways in India by highway number
 List of National Highways in India

 General
 Transport in India
 Aerial lift in India

References

External links
 Bharatmala presentation - Oct 2017
 bharatmala-phase, MorTH, GoI.

Modi administration initiatives
Proposed road infrastructure in India
2015 establishments in India